The Ride is the fifth studio album by contemporary Christian group 4Him, released in 1994 on Benson Records. The album reached No. 2 on the Billboard Top Christian Albums chart.

Track listing

Personnel 
4Him
 Andy Chrisman – lead vocals (1, 3, 5, 6, 10), backing vocals 
 Mark Harris – lead vocals (5, 7, 10), backing vocals 
 Marty Magehee – lead vocals (4, 9), backing vocals
 Kirk Sullivan – lead vocals (1, 2, 8, 10), backing vocals 
 Vocal arrangements on Tracks 3, 7, 8 & 9 – 4Him

Musicians
 Peter Wolf – arrangements (1, 5, 10), keyboards (1), bass (1), multi-instruments (5, 10)
 Michael Omartian – keyboards (2, 4, 6)
 Don Koch – keyboards and programming (3, 7, 8, 9), track arrangements (3, 7, 8, 9), vocal arrangements (3, 7, 8, 9)
 Blair Masters – programming (3, 8)
 Sheldon Reynolds – guitar (1)
 Jerry McPherson – guitar (2, 4, 6), additional guitar (3, 7, 8, 9)
 Tom Hemby – additional guitar (3, 7, 8, 9)
 Michael Hodge – guitar (3, 7, 8, 9)
 Bruce Gaitsch – guitar (10)
 Jackie Street – bass (3, 7, 8, 9)
 Vinnie Colaiuta – drums (1, 5, 10)
 Chris McHugh – drums (2, 4, 6)
 John Hammond – drums (3, 7, 8, 9)
 Eric Darken – percussion (3, 8, 9)
 Everette Harp – alto sax solo (1), alto saxophone (5)
 Larry Williams – saxophones (1)
 Mark Douthit – saxophones (2, 7)
 Bill Reichenbach, Jr. – trombone (1)
 Chris McDonald – trombone (7), horn arrangements (7)
 Gary Grant – trumpet (1)
 Jerry Hey – trumpet (1)
 Mike Haynes – trumpet (2, 7)
 Jeff Bailey – trumpet (7)

The Nashville String Machine (Tracks 3, 4, 8 & 9)
 Don Wyrtzen – French horn and string arrangements (3, 8, 9)
 Michael Omartian – string arrangements (4)
 David Angell John Catchings, Bruce Christensen, David Davidson, Carl Gorodetzky, Jim Grosjean, Robert Heuer, Jack Jezioro, Anthony LaMarchina, Lee Larrison, Ted Madsen, Bob Mason, Tom McAninch, Leslie Norton, Randall Olson, Monisa Phillips, Mary Lee Scott, Pamela Sixfin, Elizabeth Stewart, Julie Tanner, Alan Umstead, Catherine Umstead, Mary Kathryn Vanosedale and Joy Worland – strings and French horns

Choir on "For Future Generations" 
 Christ Church Choir
 Brett Barry, Erin Barry, Bill Baumgart, Jane Baumgart, Carrie Hodge, Michael Hodge, Darris Jordan, Leslie Koch, Ann Trubey, Beverly White and Brett Wilson – additional choir

Production 
 Bill Baumgart – executive producer
 Tom Lord-Alge – mixing (1-7, 10)
 David Betancourt – mix assistant (1-7, 10)
 John Jaszcz – mixing (8, 9)
 John Hurley – mix assistant (8)
 Mark Ralston – mix assistant (9)
 Encore Studios (Burbank, California) – mixing location (1-7, 10)
 The Castle (Franklin, Tennessee) – mixing location (8)
 Sound Stage Studios (Nashville, Tennessee) – mixing location (9)
 Connie Harrington – art direction 
 The Riordan Design Group, Inc. – design 
 Mark Tucker – group photography 
 David White – roller coaster photography 
 Elizabeth Martin – grooming, make-up 
 Claudia McConnell-Fowler – stylist
 Mike Atkins – management 

Tracks 1, 5 & 10
 Peter Wolf – producer 
 Paul Ericksen – recording
 The Embassy Recording Studio (Simi Valley, California) – recording location 

Tracks 2, 4 & 6
 Michael Omartian – producer 
 Susan Martinez – production coordinator 
 Terry Christian – engineer 
 Scott Link – assistant engineer 
 David Jahnsen – additional engineer
 Tejas Recorders (Franklin, Tennessee) – recording location 
 The Sound Kitchen (Franklin, Tennessee) – recording location 

Tracks 3, 7, 8 & 9
 Don Koch – producer, additional recording (8)
 Brett Wilson – production assistant 
 John Jaszcz – recording 
 Doug Sarrett – additional recording (3, 7, 9)
 Lynn Fuston – additional recording (3)
 John Hurley – additional recording (3)
 David Jahnsen – additional recording (3)
 Bret Teegarden – additional recording (9)
 The Bennett House (Franklin, Tennessee) – recording location
 The Sound Kitchen (Franklin, Tennessee) – recording location 
 Classic Recording Studio (Franklin, Tennessee) – recording location 
 Great Circle Sound (Nashville, Tennessee) – recording location
 Quad Studios (Nashville, Tennessee) – recording location
 The Lunch Box (Nashville, Tennessee) – recording location
 Uno Mas Studios (Brentwood, Tennessee) – recording location

References

1994 albums
4Him albums
albums produced by Peter Wolf
albums produced by Michael Omartian